The April 1949 Singapore Municipal Commission election took place on 2 April 1949 to elect 18 of the 27 seats in the Singapore Municipal Commission.

Background 
The election was the first election for the Singapore Municipal Commission since the municipal commissioner elections on 5 December 1911. In 1913, elections for the Singapore Municipal Commission were scrapped due to excessive politicking.

Following the end of World War II, elections were brought back for the Singapore Municipal Commission. Out of the 27 seats in the Singapore Municipal Commission, 18 seats were elected. These 18 seats were distributed to six wards in Singapore with each ward having three seats. The remaining nine seats were appointed by the British colonial government.

For the April 1949 election, municipal commissioners were elected to terms of varying lengths depending on their ranking in their respective wards. Commissioners who ranked third in their wards were elected to a term that ended in December 1949. Commissioners who ranked second had a term that ended in December 1950, and commissioners ranking first had a term that ended in December 1951.

Voting in this election was not compulsory, and voters were required to register in order to vote.

Nomination day was scheduled for 7 March 1949. Candidates were required to give an election deposit of $250 which was returned if they achieved at least 4.17% of the votes.

Results

By constituency

Terms of elected commissioners

References 

1949 04
1949 in Singapore
Singapore
April 1949 events in Asia